The 2013 mayoral election in Harrisburg, Pennsylvania was held on November 5, 2013, and resulted in Eric Papenfuse, a local bookstore owner and Democrat, being elected to his first term.

Background
Incumbent first term Democratic mayor Linda D. Thompson was extremely unpopular. In large part due to her calling City Controller Dan Miller, the first openly gay official in Harrisburg, a “homosexual, evil little man” along with other inflammatory rhetoric.

Campaign
Thompson sought re-election but would face challenges in the Democratic Primary in the form of Dan Miller, the aforementioned City Controller, and Eric Papenfuse, a local bookstore owner. Papenfuse would win the nomination but Miller would run for mayor under the Republican ticket as the party failed to field a candidate. Papenfuse would go on to defeat Miller a second time during the general election and become Harrisburg's new mayor.

Results

See also
 2013 United States elections
 List of mayors of Harrisburg, Pennsylvania

References

Harrisburg
 2013
Harrisburg